Tom Barnes (September 1, 1946 – October 11, 2016) was an American journalist, who worked for the Pittsburgh Post-Gazette as Harrisburg Bureau Chief.

Barnes, a native of Pittsburgh, Pennsylvania, earned a B.A. degree from University of Michigan and a M.A. in journalism from University of Missouri. Following graduation, he worked for The Hartford Courant for 10 years. He began working at the Pittsburgh Post-Gazette in 1984, where he has covered Pittsburgh Mayors Richard Caliguiri and Sophie Masloff before taking the "development beat" in the mid-1990s, to cover the construction of Heinz Field, PNC Park, the David L. Lawrence Convention Center, and neighborhood development issues. In 2003, he was assigned to the Harrisburg Bureau Chief.

In 2005, he was named one of "Pennsylvania's Most Influential Reporters" by the Pennsylvania political news website PoliticsPA.

In 2014, he and his wife Beth moved to Tucson, Arizona. He died at home on October 11, 2016, from prostate cancer at the age of 70.

References

1946 births
2016 deaths
Writers from Pittsburgh
Pennsylvania political journalists
American newspaper reporters and correspondents
Missouri School of Journalism alumni
University of Michigan alumni
Pittsburgh Post-Gazette people
Journalists from Pennsylvania